The Samsung NX2000 is a rangefinder-styled mirrorless interchangeable lens camera announced by Samsung on May 1, 2013. It has a 20 megapixel sensor, WiFi, and a touch screen, and uses the iFunction menu system.

References

http://www.dpreview.com/products/samsung/slrs/samsung_nx2000/specifications

Live-preview digital cameras
NX2000
Cameras introduced in 2013